La Voix is the French Canadian version of the Dutch reality vocal competition created by John de Mol  The Voice of Holland . Season 5 of La Voix was broadcast in 2017 on TVA and was hosted for a fifth consecutive season by Charles Lafortune. Éric Lapointe, Marc Dupré and Pierre Lapointe season 4 judges all returned, whereas fourth season judge Ariane Moffatt was replaced by Isabelle Boulay, who returned after a one-season hiatus.

Season

Blind Auditions

Les duels

Les chants de bataille (Knockouts)

Episode 9 
  Contestant saved
  Contestant eliminated
After les Duels, each team consisted of eight contestants. The team coach would select five to go straight to the Live Shows, whereas the remaining three on his/her team would be in danger of elimination. Each contestant would sing a self-chosen song, with the coach having the option of saving only one to join his other 5 in the Live Shows for a resulting final 6 in each team. The other two are eliminated from the competition.

Live Shows
Starting with this stage, all shows were broadcast live.
  Contestant saved
  Contestant eliminated

Episode 10 
At the beginning of the episode, Birdy sang collectively with the 12 finalists.

Episode 11 
At the beginning of the episode, Zaz sang collectively with the 12 finalists.

Semi-final 
At the start of the show, Safia Nolin sang with the 8 semi-finalists.

Finals 
Ludovick Bourgeois from Team Éric Lapointe won the title, obtaining 50% of popular vote. 

La Voix
2017 Canadian television seasons